The 2022 Wimbledon Championships was a Grand Slam tier tennis tournament that took place at the All England Lawn Tennis and Croquet Club in Wimbledon, London, United Kingdom. Novak Djokovic successfully defended his gentlemen's singles title to claim his 21st major title, defeating Nick Kyrgios in the final. Ashleigh Barty was the reigning ladies' champion, but did not defend her title after retiring from professional tennis in March 2022. The ladies' singles title was won by Elena Rybakina, who defeated Ons Jabeur in the final.

This year, the AELTC barred Russian and Belarusian tennis players from competing, because of the 2022 Russian invasion of Ukraine. In reaction, the WTA, ATP, and ITF withdrew ranking points from the tournament.

This was the final Wimbledon tournament during the reign of Queen Elizabeth II on her Platinum Jubilee, prior to her death on 8 September of that year.

From July 2023 onwards, the Wimbledon tournament will now be staged under the reign of King Charles III.

Tournament 
The tournament was played on grass courts, with all main draw matches played at the All England Lawn Tennis and Croquet Club, Wimbledon from 27 June to 10 July 2022. Initial wild card entries were first announced on 14 June 2022. Qualifying matches were played from 20 June to 23 June 2022 at the Bank of England Sports Ground in Roehampton.

The 2022 championships were the 135th edition, the 128th staging of the ladies’ singles championship event, the 54th in the Open Era, and the third Grand Slam tournament of the year. The tournament was being run by the International Tennis Federation (ITF) and included in the 2022 ATP Tour and the 2022 WTA Tour calendars under the Grand Slam category, as well as the 2022 ITF tours for junior and wheelchair competitions respectively. The tournament consisted of men's (singles and doubles), women's (singles and doubles), mixed doubles, boys' (under 18 – singles and doubles, under 14 – singles), girls' (under 18 – singles and doubles, under 14 – singles), which were a part of the Grade A category of tournaments for under 18, and singles & doubles events for men's and women's wheelchair tennis players. This edition marked the return of the gentlemen's and ladies' invitational doubles competitions for the first time since 2019, along with the introduction of a new mixed invitational doubles draw.

This was the tournament's first edition with a scheduled order of play on the first Sunday during the event, dubbed "Middle Sunday". Prior to the 2022 edition, the tournament had seen only four exceptions to the tradition of withholding competition on Middle Sunday to accommodate delayed matches during championships that were heavily disrupted by rain. Additionally, this was the first edition of the tournament to have a champions tie break rule in the final set. Unlike in 2019 and 2021, which had a standard seven-point tie break at 12 games all in the final set, this tie break was played up to 10 points when a match reaches 6 games all, to be won by two clear points to win the match. 

To commemorate the centenary of the opening of Centre Court in 1922 and to mark the inauguration of middle Sunday play, several former singles champions were invited to a special celebration on Sunday 3 July 2022. The event was hosted by Sue Barker and Clare Balding with John McEnroe, who paid tribute to Barker's thirty years as the BBC's Wimbledon presenter. The champions were presented first by the number of singles titles won and then chronologically within that category from furthest to most recent winners. In order of presentation the champions were: one-time winners – Angela Mortimer, Ann Jones, Stan Smith, Jan Kodeš, Patrick "Pat" Cash, Conchita Martínez, Martina Hingis, Goran Ivanišević, Lleyton Hewitt, Marion Bartoli, Angelique Kerber and Simona Halep; two-time winners – Stefan Edberg, Rafael Nadal, Petra Kvitová and Andy Murray; three-time winners – Margaret Smith Court, John Newcombe, Chris Evert and John McEnroe; four-time winner Rod Laver; five-time winners Björn Borg and Venus Williams; six-time winners Billie Jean King and Novak Djokovic; and eight-time winner Roger Federer. The only nine-time singles champion, Martina Navratilova, cancelled her appearance after contracting COVID-19 on the morning of the event. British former player Tim Henman was also presented to reminisce about his matches on the court as a member of the Wimbledon Committee of Management.

Singles players 
 Gentlemen's singles

 Ladies' singles

Events

Gentlemen's singles

  Novak Djokovic def.  Nick Kyrgios, 4–6, 6–3, 6–4, 7–6(7–3)

Ladies' singles

  Elena Rybakina def.  Ons Jabeur, 3–6, 6–2, 6–2

Gentlemen's doubles

  Matthew Ebden /  Max Purcell def.  Nikola Mektić /  Mate Pavić, 7–6(7–5), 6–7(3–7), 4–6, 6–4, 7–6(10–2)

Ladies' doubles

  Barbora Krejčíková /  Kateřina Siniaková def.  Elise Mertens /  Zhang Shuai 6–2, 6–4

Mixed doubles

  Neal Skupski /  Desirae Krawczyk def.  Matthew Ebden /  Samantha Stosur, 6–4, 6–3

Wheelchair gentlemen's singles

  Shingo Kunieda def.  Alfie Hewett, 4–6, 7–5, 7–6(10–5)

Wheelchair ladies' singles

  Diede de Groot def.  Yui Kamiji, 6–4, 6–2

Wheelchair quad singles

  Sam Schröder def.  Niels Vink, 7–6(7–5), 6–1

Wheelchair gentlemen's doubles

  Gustavo Fernandez /  Shingo Kunieda def.  Alfie Hewett /  Gordon Reid, 6–3, 6–1

Wheelchair ladies' doubles

  Yui Kamiji /  Dana Mathewson def.  Diede de Groot /  Aniek van Koot, 6–1, 7–5

Wheelchair quad doubles

  Sam Schröder /  Niels Vink def.  Andy Lapthorne /  David Wagner, 6–7(4–7), 6–2, 6–3

Boys' singles

  Mili Poljičak def.  Michael Zheng, 7–6(7–2), 7–6(7–3)

Girls' singles

  Liv Hovde def.  Luca Udvardy, 6–3, 6–4

Boys' doubles

  Sebastian Gorzny /  Alex Michelsen def.  Gabriel Debru /  Paul Inchauspé, 7–6(7–5), 6–3

Girls' doubles

  Rose Marie Nijkamp /  Angella Okutoyi def.  Kayla Cross /  Victoria Mboko, 3–6, 6–4, [11–9]

Boys' 14&U singles

  Cho Se-hyuk def.  Carel Aubriel Ngounoue, 7–6(7–5), 6–3

Girls' 14&U singles

  Alexia Ioana Tatu def.  Andreea Diana Soare, 7–6(7–2), 6–4

Gentlemen's invitation doubles

  Bob Bryan /  Mike Bryan def.  Xavier Malisse /  Marcos Baghdatis, 6–3, 6–4

Ladies' invitation doubles

  Kim Clijsters /  Martina Hingis def.  Daniela Hantuchová /  Laura Robson, 6–4, 6–2

Mixed invitation doubles

  Nenad Zimonjić /  Marion Bartoli def.  Todd Woodbridge /  Cara Black, 7–6(7–1), 6–1

Prize money 
The Wimbledon Championships total prize money for 2022 is a record £40,350,000, an increase of 15.23% compared to 2021 and 6.18% vs 2019 when the event was last played with a full capacity crowd.

*per team

Controversy regarding the participation of Russian and Belarusian players 

In April 2022, the AELTC moved to ban players representing Russia or Belarus from entering the 2022 championships, in consequence of the 2022 Russian invasion of Ukraine, stating that "it would be unacceptable for the Russian regime to derive any benefits from the involvement of Russian or Belarusian players." They also cited the guidance given by the British government, regarding assurances that players are not in support of the war, as risking endangering the players and their families. The Lawn Tennis Association also banned players representing Russia and Belarus from other tennis tournaments taking place in the United Kingdom. Apart from the Davis Cup and Billie Jean King Cup, players from these countries have been allowed to compete in other tournaments, including at the Grand Slam level at the 2022 French Open, as neutral players without national flags. The US Open also confirmed that Russian and Belarusian players will be able to compete in its tournament.

The decision attracted criticism from many players, including from defending and six-time champion Novak Djokovic, who described it as 'crazy'. Andrey Rublev, one of the players affected by the ban, accused the All England Club of making an 'illogical' and 'discriminatory' decision. Others such as Ukrainians Marta Kostyuk and Sergiy Stakhovsky, came out in support of the ban. The three governing bodies of tennis — the ATP, WTA, and ITF — criticised the decision. On 20 May, they stripped the tournament of its ranking points, on the basis of the principle of participation based on merit rather than nationality, as well as the unilateral decision by the AELTC that contrasts with the remainder of the tour. This decision received criticism as well, with two-time men's singles champion Andy Murray commenting that the removal of ranking points will likely not affect participation in the event and has frustrated players.

On 4 July, a fine was levied by the WTA against the AELTC and the LTA, with a fine of $250,000 for the AELTC and $750,000 for the LTA, as a consequence of the ban. Both organisations are expected to appeal the decision.

References

External links 

 

 
Wimbledon Championships
Wimbledon Championships
Wimbledon Championships
Wimbledon Championships
Wimbledon Championships
Wimbledon Championships
Tennis controversies
Wimbledon Championships
Wimbledon